A Weak Woman (French: Une faible femme) is a 1933 French comedy film directed by Max de Vaucorbeil and starring Meg Lemonnier, André Luguet and Pierre de Guingand.

Cast
 Meg Lemonnier as Arlette Morand  
 André Luguet as Henri Fournier  
 Pierre de Guingand as Serge Armeville  
 Betty Daussmond as Mme. Benoit-Lenger  
 Germaine Roger as Jacqueline  
 Nane Germon

References

Bibliography 
 Crisp, Colin. Genre, Myth and Convention in the French Cinema, 1929-1939. Indiana University Press, 2002.

External links 
 

1933 films
1933 comedy films
French comedy films
1930s French-language films
Films directed by Max de Vaucorbeil
French films based on plays
Films based on works by Jacques Deval
French black-and-white films
1930s French films